Kazuko Naito (born 15 October 1973) is a Japanese table tennis player. She competed in the women's doubles event at the 2000 Summer Olympics.

References

1973 births
Living people
Japanese female table tennis players
Olympic table tennis players of Japan
Table tennis players at the 2000 Summer Olympics
Place of birth missing (living people)